The  or JELC is a Lutheran church in Japan. It currently has approximately 21,990 baptized members in 122 congregations nationwide.

The current president of the JELC is the Rev Sumiyuki Watanabe.

History

Early history
The beginnings of the JELC go back to 1892 when the first missionaries to Japan were sent by the United Synod of the South, a predecessor of the Lutheran Church in America, arrived in Yokohama. The first worship service in Japan was observed on Easter Sunday of 1893 in the city of Saga on the island of Kyūshū under the leadership of James Augustin Brown Scherer and R. B. Peery assisted by a Japanese co-worker, .

The first 16 believers were baptised within the first 2 years of the work and by 1898, the JELC was organized with 60 baptised members with the city of Kumamoto becoming the center of Japanese Lutheranism. The first expatriate workers were soon joined by missionaries from the American Danish Lutheran Church (1898) and Finland (1900). The first church building was also consecrated in the city of Saga in 1900.

In 1909, the Lutheran Theological Seminary was established in Kamamoto to train national workers and by 1920 congregations were being established in major cities like Tokyo, Osaka, and Kobe. In 1925, the Lutheran Theological Seminary was transferred to Nakano, Tokyo.

Second World War
All foreign missionaries were expelled from the country and some churches were closed in this period. The JELC ceased to exist and only reconstituted themselves upon the end of the war.

Post war period
The end of the Second World War saw an influx of foreign missionaries, particularly from the United States. As many as 12 different Lutheran denominations and mission societies established work in Japan. Former Lutheran members from the UCCJ met in Kamamoto in 1947 and decided to withdraw from the UCCJ and re-establish the JELC.

The JELC worked in close cooperation with many of the mission agencies and in 1963, the Tokai Lutheran Mission of the Evangelical Lutheran Church merged with the JELC. In 1969, the Lutheran Theological Seminary was moved to Mitaka, Tokyo and in the same year the JELC embarked on a 5-year plan to achieve self-sufficiency and by 1974, the goals set forth had generally been achieved.

Current developments
In 1993, a Mission Centennial Assembly was held in Kumamoto. Despite having a comparatively small membership with most congregations having less than 50 members, the JELC has sent successive missionaries to serve among Japanese immigrants in Brazil, serving with the Evangelical Church of the Lutheran Confession in Brazil, as well as to the United States among expatriate Japanese.

A ten-year evangelism and church restructuring program known as Power Mission 21 was adopted in 2002 to move the JELC into a new era of true independence through structural reformation and a renewed emphasis on evangelism. This includes an emphasis on youth evangelism as well as fostering the Christian growth of youth, the strengthening of the laity and lay led evangelism, clergy continuing education and a program for clergy review, as well as church/congregational restructuring in order to strengthen outreach.

Structure & organization
The current president of the JELC is the Rev. Masatoshi Yamanouchi who formerly served as the Executive Director of the JELC. The JELC is divided into 5 regional districts which are further subdivided into geographical areas and institutions.

List of districts
Kyūshū District link
Congregations in the prefectures of Fukuoka, Kumamoto, Saga, Nagasaki, Ōita, Miyazaki, and Kagoshima
Western District link
Congregations in the prefectures of Kyoto, Osaka, Hyōgo, Okayama, Hiroshima, Shimane, Kagawa, Ehime, and Yamaguchi
Tokai District link
Congregations in the prefectures of Shizuoka, Aichi, and Gifu
Eastern District link
Congregations in the prefectures of Miyagi, Chiba, Tokyo, Kanagawa, Yamanashi, and Nagano
Hokkaido District link
Congregations in the prefecture of Hokkaidō

Ministries
Throughout the history of the JELC, education has been emphasized along with evangelism. Social welfare has also long been an important part of the JELC's work.

Education
Kyūshū District
Kyushu Gakuin Junior & Senior High School, Kumamoto, Kyūshū
Established in 1911 for the training of pastors and the education of young men. Became co-educational in 1991
Luther Junior & Senior High School, Kumamoto, Kyūshū
Established in 1924 for the education of young women. Became co-educational in 2001
Kyushu Lutheran College, Kumamoto, Kyūshū
Established in 1975 as the Kyushu Women's Junior College. Received accreditation as a four-year college in 1997
Eastern District
Japan Lutheran College, Mitaka, Tokyo
Established in 1909 as the Lutheran Theological Seminary in Kumamoto, Kyūshū. Relocated to Tokyo in 1925 and received accreditation as a four-year college in 1964. In 1996, the college is renamed Japan Lutheran College and the seminary administered as a separate entity.
Japan Lutheran Theological Seminary, Mitaka, Tokyo
Originally part of the original Lutheran Theological Seminary, it merged with the School of Theology established by the Japan Lutheran Church and has been administered separately as the Japan Lutheran Theological Seminary since 1996.

Many local congregations in all districts serve their communities through Christian kindergartens and nursery schools.

Social welfare
Social welfare has long been an important part of Japan Evangelical Lutheran Church. Two institutions, Jiai-en (House of Mercy) in Kumamoto and The Tokyo Home for the Elderly in Tokyo, have been leading pioneers in the field of social work in Japan. The Kamagasaki Diaconia Center in the slums of Osaka includes child care, mutual learning, problem study, and community projects.

Affiliations

Ecumenism
The JELC participates in ecumenical relationships through:

National Christian Council in Japan
Christian Conference of Asia
World Council of Churches
Lutheran World Federation
Asian Lutheran Communion

The JELC also works in partnership with:

Evangelical Lutheran Church in America
South Carolina Synod

Relationship with other Lutheran churches
The work of Lutheran missionaries resulted in the establishment of five major Lutheran church bodies and a number of smaller ones, with a total membership of approximately 30,000. The largest of these, with about 20,000 members, is the JELC. Other Lutheran churches include the Kinki Evangelical Lutheran Church, the West Japan Evangelical Lutheran Church, the Japan Lutheran Brethren Church, the Lutheran Evangelical Christian Church and the Fellowship Deaconry Evangelical Church (Marburger Mission and Liberty Corner Mission).

Cooperation among the various Lutheran churches in Japan is common, particularly with respect to outreach ministries. Church planting plans are mutually shared in order to avoid duplications.

The NRK and the JELC sponsor a joint seminary in Tokyo, the Japan Lutheran Theological Seminary whilst the other Lutheran seminary in Kobe is sponsored by the Kinki Evangelical Lutheran Church and the West Japan Evangelical Lutheran Church.

See also

Christianity in Japan
Protestantism in Japan
Japan Evangelical Lutheran Kumamoto Church

References

External links

Lutheranism in Japan
Japan
Religious organizations established in 1898
Lutheran denominations established in the 19th century
1898 establishments in Japan